InTech Collegiate Academy (often known simply as InTech) is located in North Logan, Utah, United States, and is a STEM focused, early college high school partnered with Utah State University. ICA serves students in 7th through 12th grades.

Statistics

 Grade levels (2006-2007): 9–10
 Grade levels (2007-2008): 9–11
 Grade levels (2008-2020): 9–12
 Grade levels (From 2020): 7-12

Awards and recognition
The Utah Board of Education has given the school an "A" grade in 2017. The U.S. News & World Report listed ICA as the top high school in Utah four times from 2012 to 2019. ICA was listed as 273 in national rankings in 2019.

See also

List of high schools in Utah

References

External links
 InTech Collegiate Academy website

Public high schools in Utah
Schools in Cache County, Utah
Educational institutions established in 2006
Charter schools in Utah
2006 establishments in Utah